Summer Struggle in Sapporo was a professional wrestling event promoted by New Japan Pro-Wrestling (NJPW). The event took place on July 10, 2021, and July 11, 2021, at Makomanai Sekisui Heim Ice Arena in Sapporo and is the second event under the Summer Struggle name and  first to take place at Sapporo. This is the first NJPW event to take place at the Makomanai Sekisui Heim Ice Arena since 2011.

In the main event of night 1, Suzuki Gun's El Desperado retained IWGP Junior Heavyweight Championship against Bullet Club's Taiji Ishimori. In the main event of night 2, Sanada and Tetsuya Naito of Los Ingobernables de Japón defeated Dangerous Tekkers (Taichi and Zack Sabre Jr.) of Suzuki Gun to win the IWGP Tag Team Championship.

Production

Background 
Since 2020, NJPW has unable to run events with a full arena capacity due to COVID-19 restrictions. On May 19, NJPW announced that Summer Struggle would return in 2021, taking place throughout July with shows happening in Sapporo, Osaka and Nagoya. Kota Ibushi was forced to miss both days due to suffering a fever due the side effects of getting COVID-19 vaccine shot.

Storylines
Summer Struggle in Sapporo will feature professional wrestling matches that involved different wrestlers from pre-existing scripted feuds and storylines. Wrestlers portrayed villains, heroes, or less distinguishable characters in the scripted events that built tension and culminated in a wrestling match or series of matches.

Results

Night 1

Night 2

References

External links
The official New Japan Pro-Wrestling website

2021 in professional wrestling
Events in Sapporo
Professional wrestling in Japan
July 2021 events in Japan
New Japan Pro-Wrestling shows